was an Edo period Japanese samurai, and the 11th daimyō  of Kaga Domain in the Hokuriku region of Japan. He was the 12th hereditary chieftain of the Kanazawa Maeda clan. 

Narinaga was born in Kanazawa as Kamemachi (亀万千) later Katsumaru (勝丸) and become Inuchiyo (犬千代), the second son of Maeda Shigemichi, after Shigemichi had retired from his position as daimyō. He was adopted by his uncle, Maeda Harunaga as heir in 1795, and was brought to Edo in 1796. In 1797, was received in formal  audience by Shōgun Tokugawa Ienari in 1754 and was given a kanji from Ienari's name, thus becoming Maeda Narinaga. In 1802, Maeda Harunaga formally retired, and Narinaga officially became daimyō, although Harunaga continued to control the domain until his death in 1810. 

Narinaga was initially married to an adopted daughter of Tokugawa Munechika of Owari Domain. He later remarried to a daughter of the Kampaku Takatsukasa Masahiro. 

Narinaga attempted some half-hearted political reforms during his tenure, and turned the domain over to his son, Maeda Nariyasu in 1822. He died two years later in 1824 at the age of 43.

Family 
Father: Maeda Shigemichi 
Mother: Tenrin’in
Adopted Father: Maeda Harunaga 
Wives:
 Matsudaira Kotohime, daughter of Matsudaira Yoshimasa
 Takatsukasa Takako (1787-1870)
Concubines:
 Oyae no Kata later Eiyou’in
 Tosei’in
 Teisei’in
 Osato no Kata later Gekkoin
Children:
 Naohime (1809-1825) betrothed to Ogasawara Tadaakira by Oyae no Kata
 Maeda Nariyasu by Oyae no Kata
 Atsuhime (1813-1852) married Matsudaira Katataka by Oyae no Kata
 Yuuhime (1813-1875) married Maeda Toshinaka by Tosei’in
 Hirohime (1815-1856) married Ogasawara Tadaakira by Oyae no Kata
 Takamejiro (1817-1825) by Oyae no Kata
 Ikuhime (1818-1829) betrothed to Takatsukasa Sukehiro by Oyae no Kata
 Takahime (1818-1831) betrothed to Arima Yorito by Teisei’in
 Suzuhime (1819-1835) married Honda Masaharu by Oyae no Kata
 Tamesaburo (1819-1819) by Osato no Kata
 Tsuguhime (1819-1823) (twins with suzuhime) by Oyae no Kata
 Nobunosuke (1821-1834) by Oyae no Kata

References 
Papinot, Edmond. (1948). Historical and Geographical Dictionary of Japan. New York: Overbeck Co.

External links
Kaga Domain on "Edo 300 HTML" (3 November 2007) 

1782 births
1824 deaths
People of Edo-period Japan
Maeda clan
Tozama daimyo
People from Kanazawa, Ishikawa